CD Vijaya Adhikari (born 20 August 1991) is a Nepali singer and a music composer. He is the winner of The Voice of Nepal Season One. He also participated in an environmental song titled "Melancholy", sung by 365 Nepali Artists, which set a Guinness World Records in entitled "Most Vocal Solos in a Song Recording". The song was conceptualized, written, composed and directed by Environmentalist Nipesh DHAKA.

Personal life

CD Vijaya Adhikari was born on 20 August 1991 as a son of Chandra Kanta Adhikari and Durga Devi Adhikari, in Machhapuchchhre-4, Lahachok, near Pokhara.

He was married to Manisha Rai who is also a well known artist of the music industry. She is one of the singers among the 365 artists of the Melancholy song too.

Career

Adhikari has given vocal to more than 200 songs which include romantic, rock, sad, ghazal and patriotic songs. Some of his hit songs are Doori Majboori, Man Magyau Man Diye, Nasha Piune Bani Bhayo, Malai Ta Birsinchau Hola Timile, Dhan Lai Maya Gariraichhau, Mero Lash Ko Malami, Natak Raichha Timro Maya, Khusi Matra, Jhanakuti Jhai Jhai (Doli).

His first film song as a playback singer was for Doli (2018).

In December 2018, he won The Voice of Nepal in its first season of the show and became a well-known name among the Nepali music listeners after winning such a grand show of its type.

Songs 
CD Vijay Adhikari has sung numerous songs since winning Season 1 of The Voice of Nepal, and some of his most well-known songs are listed below.

Awards and achievements
2019 World Nepali Music Award, New York, Best Modern Song Male for the song Afnai Geet
2019 National Sadhana Music Award, The Best Singer for the song Suseldai Timile
2018 The Voice of Nepal Winner
2018 Radio Nepal All Nepal Aadhunik Song Competition Winner
2012 Khoji Prativako – 2, First runner up
2010 Annapurna Award for the Most Promising Pokhreli Artist of the Year for the song Hansu Bhanda Pani
2010 Prithvi Narayan Campus (PNC) Idol, Pokhara, Winner
2010 Big Icon, Pokhara, First runner up
2007 Gandaki Tara, Pokhara, Second runner up
2004 Matribhumi Tara, Pokhara, Winner
2003 Dhuk Dhuki Award for the Child Artist of the Year for the song Ustai Aankha Ustai Bhaka (Aabhas)

See also 
 The Voice of Nepal
 Melancholy Song

References

External links
 
 CD Vijaya Adhikari on YouTube

People from Kaski District
1991 births
21st-century Nepalese male singers
Living people
People from Pokhara
The Voice (franchise) winners